Pararchidendron is a genus of flowering plants in the family Fabaceae. It belongs to the mimosoid clade of the subfamily Caesalpinioideae.

Species
Species include:
 Pararchidendron pruinosum—snowwood

References

Mimosoids
Fabaceae genera